The Online Film Critics Society Award for Best Director is an annual film award given by the Online Film Critics Society to honor the best director of the year.

Winners

1990s

2000s

2010s

2020s

References
OFCS - Awards

Awards for best director